Grand River Township is a township in Daviess County, in the U.S. state of Missouri.

Grand River Township took its name from the Grand River.

References

Townships in Missouri
Townships in Daviess County, Missouri